STS-41-B was the tenth NASA Space Shuttle mission and the fourth flight of the . It launched on 3 February 1984, and landed on 11 February 1984 after deploying two communications satellites. It was also notable for including the first untethered spacewalk.

Following STS-9, the flight numbering system for the Space Shuttle program was changed. Thus, the next flight, instead of being designated STS-10, became STS-41-B; the original successor to STS-9, STS-10, was canceled due to payload delays.

Crew

Spacewalks 
EVA 1
 Personnel: McCandless and Stewart
 Date: 7 February 1984
 Duration: 5 hours, 55 minutes

EVA 2
 Personnel: McCandless and Stewart
 Date: 9 February 1984
 Duration: 6 hours, 17 minutes

Crew seating arrangements

Mission summary 

Challenger lifted off from Kennedy Space Center at 08:00:00 a.m. EST on 3 February 1984. It was estimated that 100,000 people attended the launch. Two communications satellites were deployed about 8 hours after launch; one, Westar 6, was for America's Western Union, and the other, Palapa B2, for Indonesia;  both were Hughes-built HS-376-series satellites. However, the Payload Assist Modules (PAM) for both satellites malfunctioned, placing them into a lower-than-planned orbit. Both satellites were retrieved successfully in November 1984 during STS-51-A, which was conducted by the orbiter Discovery.

The STS-41-B crew included commander Vance D. Brand, making his second Shuttle flight; pilot Robert L. Gibson; and mission specialists Bruce McCandless II, Ronald E. McNair, and Robert L. Stewart.

On the fourth day of the mission, astronauts McCandless and Stewart performed the first untethered spacewalk, operating the Manned Maneuvering Unit (MMU) for the first time. McCandless ventured out  from the orbiter, while Stewart tested the "work station" foot restraint at the end of the Remote Manipulator System (Canadarm). On the seventh day of the mission, both astronauts performed another extravehicular activity (EVA) to practice capture procedures for the Solar Maximum Mission (SMM) satellite retrieval and repair operation, which was planned for the next mission, STS-41-C.

STS-41-B also achieved the reflight of the West German-sponsored SPAS-1 pallet/satellite, which had originally flown on STS-7. This time, however, it remained in the payload bay due to an electrical problem in the RMS (Canadarm). The mission also carried five Get Away Special (GAS) canisters, six live rats in the middeck area, a Cinema-360 camera and a continuation of the Continuous Flow Electrophoresis System and Monodisperse Latex Reactor experiments. Included in one of the GAS canisters was the first experiment designed and built by a high school team to fly in space. The experiment, on seed germination and growth in zero gravity, was created and built by a team of four students from Brighton High School in Utah through a partnership with Utah State University.

The 7 days, 23 hours, 15 minutes, and 55 seconds flight ended on 11 February 1984 with a successful landing at Kennedy Space Center's Shuttle Landing Facility. This marked the first landing of a spacecraft at its launch site. Challenger completed 128 orbits and traveled .

Mission insignia 
Designed by artist Robert McCall, the eleven stars in the blue field symbolize the mission's original designation as STS-11. The left panel shows the deployment of a satellite, and the right panel shows an astronaut using the MMU.

Wake-up calls 
NASA began a tradition of playing music to astronauts during the Project Gemini, and first used music to wake up a flight crew during Apollo 15. Each track is specially chosen, often by the astronauts' families, and usually has a special meaning to an individual member of the crew, or is applicable to their daily activities.

After the mission 
Astronaut Bruce McCandless II sued singer Dido in 2010 over the use of a public domain photo of him in space on this mission on her 2008 album Safe Trip Home.

See also 

 List of human spaceflights
 List of Space Shuttle missions
 Lists of spacewalks and moonwalks

References

External links 
 Mission summary  and additional information  NASA
 STS-41-B video highlights  NSS
 Bruce McCandelss famous spacewalk NASA channel on YouTube

Space Shuttle missions
1984 in spaceflight
Spacecraft launched in 1984
1984 in the United States
1984 in science
Spacecraft which reentered in 1984